KOAL (750 AM) is a radio station broadcasting a news/talk format. Licensed to Price, Utah, United States, the station is currently owned by Eastern Utah Broadcasting Co.

750 AM is a United States and Canadian clear-channel frequency.

KOAL broadcasts in the HD Radio format.

References

External links

OAL
Radio stations established in 1939
1939 establishments in Utah